José de Jesús Tizol was a Puerto Rican politician, senator and delegate.

De Jesús Tizol was one of the many founders of the Ateneo Puertorriqueño.

During the early 1900s, de Jesús was a member of the Puerto Rico House of Delegates for various terms.

In 1917, de Jesús was elected as a member of the first Puerto Rican Senate established by the Jones-Shafroth Act. He represented the District I (San Juan).

References

Members of the Senate of Puerto Rico